Amblyomma gervaisi is a hard-bodied tick of the genus Amblyomma. The tick is a parasite of snakes, such as Naja naja, Python molurus species and monitor species such as Varanus ocellatus, Varanus yemenensis, Varanus benghalensis, Varanus griseus and many other Varanus species
in southeastern Asia and Asia-minor. They exhibit sexual dimorphism. They can be found in Sri Lanka, India, Yemen, Saudi Arabia. It is a potential vector for Coxiella burnetii.

References

External links
Borrelia sp. phylogenetically different from Lyme disease- and relapsing fever-related Borrelia spp. in Amblyomma varanense from Python reticulatus
Amblyomma gervaisi - ZipcodeZoo
Microscopic anatomy of the Haller’s organ of snake ticks

Amblyomma
Animals described in 1847